In mathematics, in the fields of multilinear algebra and representation theory, the principal invariants of the second rank tensor  are the coefficients of the characteristic polynomial

,

where  is the identity operator and  represent the polynomial's eigenvalues.

More broadly, any scalar-valued function  is an invariant of  if and only if  for all orthogonal . This means that a formula expressing an invariant in terms of components, will give the same result for all Cartesian bases. For example, even though individual diagonal components of  will change with a change in basis, the sum of diagonal components will not change.

Properties
The principal invariants do not change with rotations of the coordinate system (they are objective, or in more modern terminology, satisfy the principle of material frame-indifference) and any function of the principal invariants is also objective.

Calculation of the invariants of rank two tensors
In a majority of engineering applications, the principal invariants of (rank two) tensors of dimension three are sought, such as those for the right Cauchy-Green deformation tensor.

Principal invariants 
For such tensors, the principal invariants are given by:

For symmetric tensors, these definitions are reduced.
 
The correspondence between the principal invariants and the characteristic polynomial of a tensor, in tandem with the Cayley–Hamilton theorem reveals that  

where  is the second-order identity tensor.

Main invariants 
In addition to the principal invariants listed above, it is also possible to introduce the notion of main invariants

which are functions of the principal invariants above. These are the coefficients of the characteristic polynomial of the deviator , such that it is traceless. The separation of a tensor into a component that is a multiple of the identity and a traceless component is standard in hydrodynamics, where the former is called isotropic, providing the modified pressure, and the latter is called deviatoric, providing shear effects.

Mixed invariants 
Furthermore, mixed invariants between pairs of rank two tensors may also be defined.

Calculation of the invariants of order two tensors of higher dimension

These may be extracted by evaluating the characteristic polynomial directly, using the Faddeev-LeVerrier algorithm for example.

Calculation of the invariants of higher order tensors

The invariants of rank three, four, and higher order tensors may also be determined.

Engineering applications
A scalar function  that depends entirely on the principal invariants of a tensor is objective, i.e., independent of rotations of the coordinate system. This property is commonly used in formulating closed-form expressions for the strain energy density, or Helmholtz free energy, of a nonlinear material possessing isotropic symmetry.

This technique was first introduced into isotropic turbulence by Howard P. Robertson in 1940 where he was able to derive Kármán–Howarth equation from the invariant principle. George Batchelor and Subrahmanyan Chandrasekhar exploited this technique and developed an extended treatment for axisymmetric turbulence.

Invariants of non-symmetric tensors  
A real tensor  in 3D (i.e., one with a 3x3 component matrix) has as many as six independent invariants, three being the invariants of its symmetric part and three characterizing the orientation of the axial vector of the skew-symmetric part relative to the principal directions of the symmetric part.

the first step would be to evaluate the axial vector  associated with the skew-symmetric part. Specifically, the axial vector has components

Even though the eigenvalues of a real non-symmetric tensor might be complex, the eigenvalues of its symmetric part will always be real and therefore can be ordered from largest to smallest. The corresponding orthonormal principal basis directions can be assigned senses to ensure that the axial vector  points within the first octant.

The remaining three invariants are the axial vector's components in this basis: . Incidentally, it is a myth that a tensor is positive definite if its eigenvalues are positive. Instead, it is positive definite if and only if the eigenvalues of its symmetric part are positive.

See also
Symmetric polynomial
Elementary symmetric polynomial
Newton's identities
Invariant theory

References

Tensors
Invariant theory
Linear algebra